Maynard School District is a public school district based in Maynard, Arkansas, United States.

History 
On July 1, 2010, the Twin Rivers School District was dissolved. A portion of the district was given to the Maynard district.

Schools 
 Maynard Elementary School, serving kindergarten through grade 6.
 Maynard High School, serving grades 7 through 12.

References

Further reading
Maps of the predecessor districts:
  (Download)

External links
 

Education in Randolph County, Arkansas
School districts in Arkansas